Fanfan la Tulipe is a 1952 French comedy adventure film directed by Christian-Jaque. It has also been categorized under swashbuckler films.  The film starred Gérard Philipe and Gina Lollobrigida. The film was remade in 2003 with Penélope Cruz in Lollobrigida's role.

Plot
In France during the Seven Years' War, Fanfan is a charming, attractive young man who is trying to escape a shotgun marriage. At this vulnerable point in his life, he is approached by the daughter of a recruiting officer, Adeline, who tells him that if he joins the army, he will find fame, fortune, and will marry the king's daughter.  Accordingly, he joins the army, only to discover that she made the whole thing up in order for her father to get a recruiting bonus.  Nevertheless, encouraged by a series of improbable circumstances, he accepts her prediction as his destiny.  A series of events ensues which shows off to great advantage his athleticism and leadership ability.  As the film progresses, we become aware of a developing attraction between himself and Adeline which however conflicts with his perceived "destiny" of marrying a king's daughter.

Cast
 Gérard Philipe as Fanfan la Tulipe
 Gina Lollobrigida as Adeline La Franchise
 Marcel Herrand as Louis XV
 Olivier Hussenot as Tranche-Montagne
 Noël Roquevert as Fier-à-Bras
 Henri Rollan as Le maréchal d'Estrées
 Nerio Bernardi as La Franchise
 Jean-Marc Tennberg as Lebel
 Geneviève Page as La marquise de Pompadour
  as Henriette de France
 Lolita De Silva as La dame d'honneur
 Irène Young as Marion
 Georgette Anys as Madame Tranche-Montagne
  as Guillot
 Lucien Callamand as Le maréchal de Brandebourg

Production
The film was photographed in black-and-white by Christian Matras.  A colorized version was created (supervised by Sophie Juin for Les Films Ariane) and issued in 2000 on DVD in Europe alongside the original version.

Awards
Won
1952 Berlin International Film Festival – Silver Berlin Bear
1952 Cannes Film Festival – Best Director

Nominated
1952 Cannes Film Festival – Grand Prize of the Festival

References

External links

Bosley Crowther NY Times Review, 5 May 1953
Fanfan la Tulipe: En Garde! an essay by Kenneth Turan at the Criterion Collection

1952 films
1950s adventure comedy films
French adventure comedy films
1950s French-language films
Films directed by Christian-Jaque
Films set in the 1760s
Seven Years' War films
French swashbuckler films
Cultural depictions of Louis XV
Cultural depictions of Madame de Pompadour
French historical adventure films
French historical comedy films
1952 comedy films
French black-and-white films
1950s French films